Anastasiya Sienina (born 1991 in Simferopol, Crimea, Soviet Union) is a Ukrainian beauty pageant titleholder who won Miss Crimea 2010. Sienina placed second runner-up at the Miss Ukraine 2010 pageant. Later she was appointed the Miss Crimea title and also became the first delegate to represent Crimea in an international beauty pageant, as she attended Miss Earth 2010.

Sienina made the Top 5 in the Miss Earth talent competition.

References 

People from Simferopol
Living people
1991 births
Miss Earth 2010 contestants
Ukrainian beauty pageant winners